Mitch Garber  (born September 5, 1964) is a Canadian lawyer, investor and business executive. 
He is a Member of the Order of Canada.

Current Activity 

Garber is an active investor/Board member, partnering with leading private equity firms, including;

 Minority owner and board member of the National Hockey League (NHL) Seattle Kraken, led by co-majority shareholders TPG Capital founder, David Bonderman and Samantha Holloway,  film producer Jerry Bruckheimer, Amazon CEO Andy Jassy, team CEO Tod Leiweke, and a group of local Seattle business leaders including David Wright, Adrian Hanauer, Ted and Chris Ackerley, and Jay Deutsch. He is also a board member of the One Roof Foundation, Seattle.

 Co-investor and board member of Rackspace, an Apollo Global Management company

 Co-investor and board member of the Fosun held Lanvin Group including iconic French fashion house Lanvin, Austria-based Wolford, Italian shoe designer Sergio Rossi. 

 Co-investor and board member of Shutterfly, an Apollo Global Management company

 Investor and Chairman of Aiola.com an Israeli Artificial Intelligence company

 He was the inaugural Chairman of Invest In Canada (Investment Canada), the Canadian government agency responsible for attracting and facilitating foreign direct investment (FDI) into Canada from 2018-2022.

Education and recognitions 

 Bialik High School Montreal ('81). 
 Diplôme D'études Collégiale (DEC), Vanier College ('83). 
 Bachelor of Arts degree in Industrial Relations McGill University ('86) 
 Law Degree University of Ottawa ('89). 
 Honorary Doctorate Juris Causa University of Montreal ('21)
 Honorary Doctorate degree University of Ottawa ('17).
 McGill University's Desautels Faculty of Management Achievement Award for significant contributions to Canadian society in business and community service ('17)
 Inducted to Wall of Fame Vanier College('19).
 Order of Merit from University of Ottawa Faculty of Civil Law ('20)
June 2019 was named to the Order Of Canada by the Governor General of Canada for his many entrepreneurial contributions as well as his philanthropic leadership and commitment to education, health and culture in Canada.

Professional career

From 1990 to 1999, Garber practiced law in Montreal at the firm Lazarus Charbonneau. He left Lazarus Charbonneau in 1999 to pursue his business career at SureFire Commerce Inc., an online payment processing start-up company he helped create with Montrealers Joel Leonoff and Rory Olson. In 2003, he engineered the merger of SureFire, then named Terra Payments Inc., with Optimal Group Inc., a NASDAQ-listed company, to form Optimal Payments, Inc., of which he became CEO. He left the company in 2006 to become CEO of Party Gaming Plc. He led the company successfully until leaving to return to Canada in 2008. (In 2017, renamed, and led by its original co-founder Joel Leonoff since 2008, Optimal Payments, now Paysafe Group, sold to CVC Capital Partners and Blackstone. 

In 2009, Garber joined with private equity firms TPG Capital and Apollo Global Management, principal owners of Caesars Entertainment to lead its newly-created and stand-alone digital gaming and entertainment business. Garber would serve as CEO of the new entity, named Caesars Interactive Entertainment (CIE), and was its first private investor.

In 2011, Garber led CIE's acquisition of Playtika, a small Israeli start-up developing games for Facebook.

In 2013, Garber added the role of CEO of Caesars Acquisition Company (CACQ), a NASDAQ-listed offshoot of Caesars Entertainment. In addition to the CIE assets, the World Series of Poker, and Playtika, being rolled into CACQ – CACQ also controlled multiple Las Vegas hotel and casinos, notably Planet Hollywood, The Cromwell, The LINQ, Bally's, Paris, and outside of Las Vegas, the Horseshoe Baltimore and Harrah's New Orleans.

On July 31, 2016, CIE announced the sale of Playtika to a Chinese consortium involving Giant Interactive Group, one of China's leading games companies, and Yunfeng Capital, the private equity firm of Alibaba Founder and CEO, Jack Ma, for $4.4 billion. 
 As of May, 2019, it is the sixth-largest sale in the history of Israel.  In January 2021, Playtika went public on Nasdaq with an enterprise value of 11 billion dollars, the largest IPO of an Israeli based company.

He has been credited with helping to save Caesars Entertainment from bankruptcy, and left Caesars Acquisition Co., on October 6, 2017 after overseeing the sale of Playtika and the successful merger of (CACQ) and Caesars Entertainment.

Philanthropy

Along with his wife, Anne-Marie Boucher, Garber commits a considerable amount of his time and money to philanthropy. 
Philanthropic initiatives Garber and Boucher have been and are currently involved with, include; :

Garber was co-chair of the 2020-2022 Combined Jewish Appeal campaign in Montreal, raising $130 million
Garber was co-chair of the 2016 $55 million Centraide (United Way) campaign in Montreal
Garber has chaired the annual fundraising Ball/Event for; The Montreal Museum of Fine Art, The Montreal Museum of Contemporary Art, The Goodman Cancer Centre, The Douglas Mental Health Institute, The Cummings Senior Citizens Centre, The Montreal Children's Hospital & The St Mary's Hospital.
Garber is a board member and past chairman of the faculty advisory board of the McGill University Faculty of Medicine
Garber and Boucher established The Garber Family Post Doctorate Fellowship in Hereditary Cancer at McGill's Faculty of Medicine as well as the Garber-Rovinescu Priorities Fund for brain research at the University of Ottawa Brain and Research Institute.
Garber and Boucher support Aleh Jerusalem and Aleh Negev hospitals in Israel and Boucher is a board member
Garber and Boucher support the St. Mary's Hospital and Boucher is Past-Chairwoman of the Board
Garber and Boucher support the Weizmann Institute in Israel and Boucher serves on the International Board
On the occasion of Boucher's 50th birthday, Garber established the Anne-Marie Boucher Scholarship Prize endowment at Boucher's former high school, Mont de Lasalle, to encourage students to graduate. Mont de Lasalle high school has one of the highest student drop-out rates in Quebec/Canada. Boucher actively oversees the annual program and awards.
The Hall of Honour at Montreal's Bialik High School, part of the school's 2009 expansion, bears his name

Varia

-Garber is a frequent public speaker on social responsibility, philanthropy and business.

-In 2015 and 2016 Garber was a member of the cast of the French-Canadian version of CBC’s hit show, Dragons' Den, called Dans l’Oeil du Dragon, becoming its first ever Anglophone judge.

-In 2016, Garber's life was profiled by the award-winning news magazine television series, W5.

-In 2016, Garber addressed the Cercle Canadien on business and politics.

-In 2016, Garber eulogized show business icon and friend René Angélil at his Las Vegas memorial service.

-In 2017, Bloomberg ranked Garber as the 7th highest-paid executive in America, with total annual compensation estimated at $91 million, alongside the likes of Tim Cook and Elon Musk.

-In 2019, Garber was awarded the Order Of Canada.

-He is part of the Stephen Bronfman led group attempting to bring Major League Baseball back to Montreal.

-He was a part-time sports radio talk show host in Montreal from 1991–1999.

Notes

External links 
 http://www.ctvnews.ca/w5/mitch-garber-rose-from-humble-beginnings-to-head-up-a-2-5-billion-empire-1.2773973

1964 births
Anglophone Quebec people
Canadian radio sportscasters
Businesspeople from Montreal
Businesspeople in the casino industry
Harrah's Entertainment
McGill University alumni
Living people
University of Ottawa Faculty of Law alumni
Canadian chief executives
Canadian chairpersons of corporations
Chief executives in the hospitality industry
Members of the Order of Canada